Valentina Anatolievna Shevchenko (
born ) is a Kyrgyzstani and Peruvian professional mixed martial artist and former Muay Thai fighter. She currently competes in the women's Flyweight division for the Ultimate Fighting Championship (UFC), where she is the former UFC Women's Flyweight Champion. As of March 7, 2023, she is ranked #1 in the women’s flyweight rankings, and #3 in the UFC women's pound-for-pound rankings.

Early and personal life
Shevchenko was born in Frunze, Kirghizia, USSR on March 7, 1988, to a Russian-Ukrainian family, but she has described herself as being "Russian"  in a Russian interview and her native language is Russian. Her family had Soviet, and later Kyrgyzstan citizenship. Her mother Elena Shevchenko is the president of Kyrgyzstan's national Muay Thai association and a former multiple-time Muay Thai champion. Her father Anatoly Shevchenko served in the Pacific Fleet of the Soviet Navy for three years during the Cold War, and played for the Kyrgyzstan national football team.

After becoming interested in combat sports at an early age, Valentina began Taekwondo at age 5, under the influence of her older sister Antonina and her mother, who both participated in the sport. At age 12 she branched out into Muay Thai kickboxing and then freestyle Vale Tudo. Her kickboxing career began in 2000 when, also at age 12, she knocked out a 22-year-old opponent, earning her the moniker "Bullet" from her trainer Pavel Fedotov because of her speed in the ring. She traveled to Peru with Fedotov and Antonina in 2007, where they became martial arts teachers, and Fedotov eventually relocated his team there permanently. She gained Peruvian citizenship in 2008 and is fluent in Russian, English, and Spanish.

Shevchenko earned an undergraduate degree in Film Directing from the National Academy of Arts of the Kyrgyz Republic. In December 2021, the university awarded her the title of an Honored Professor.

In April 2019, she was awarded by Kyrgyz President Sooronbay Jeenbekov with the Dank Order. She was awarded during her first visit to Kyrgyzstan in seven years, during which Jeenbekov praised Shevchenko's role in her profession, saying that she "defended the honour of our Kyrgyzstan". Valentina and Antonina made UFC history by becoming the first pair of sisters to feature on the same fight card at UFC 255.

Muay Thai and kickboxing career

From 2003 to 2015, Shevchenko collectively won more than 90 amateur/pro matches in K-1, Muay Thai and kickboxing (eight were won by technical knockout, two by knockout). She received her first loss in kickboxing when she fought Debby Urkens (WFCA) in 2008 and her second one against Cong Wang in 2015. Shevchenko won 8 gold medals (2003, 2006, 2007, 2008, 2009, 2010, 2012, 2014) when she competed in the IFMA world championships, as well as the IMFA Royal World Cup in 2015. During these competitions, Shevchenko defeated future UFC Women's Strawweight Champion Joanna Jędrzejczyk three times and future UFC fighter Lina Länsberg once. Shevchenko is considered to be one of the best female Muay Thai fighters in the world.

Mixed martial arts career

Early career
Shevchenko made her professional debut in mixed martial arts at the age of 15 on April 21, 2003 at Kyrgiz Federation of Kulatuu against fellow debuting fighter Eliza Aidaralieva. She won the fight via TKO in the second round.

Competing in regional Kyrgiz, Russian and Korean promotions she went undefeated in her next 6 fights, winning all of them via a first-round finish, before deciding to take a hiatus from MMA in 2006 to focus on her Muay Thai and kickboxing career.

She returned to active competition and made her US debut against a future UFC title contender Liz Carmouche on September 30, 2010 at C3 Fights in Concho, Oklahoma.  Despite dominating her opponent for the majority of the first round, Shevchenko suffered her first loss after a controversial doctor stoppage due to a large cut caused by an illegal upkick. The referee decided not to call foul, which would result in a disqualification win for Shevchenko, and the fight was instead waved off by the doctor and ruled as a TKO win for Carmouche. After successfully rebounding from her loss in the following year by defeating Akjarkyn Baiturbaeva via unanimous decision and earning the first decision win of her career in the process, Shevchenko took another break from the sport, during which she continued to compete in amateur Muay Thai bouts.

She made her return again in 2013 under the banner of a South American MMA promotion Fusion FC, where she earned two TKO wins with a turnaround of just two months between the fights. With these victories, she improved her professional record to 10–1.

Legacy Fighting Championship
In 2014, it was announced that Legacy FC had signed Shevchenko for MMA and kickboxing. She faced Jan Finney on February 27, 2015, at Legacy Fighting Championship 39, winning the fight via unanimous decision (30-27, 30-27, and 30-27).

Ultimate Fighting Championship

Shevchenko made her UFC debut as a short-notice replacement for Germaine de Randamie against Sarah Kaufman at UFC on Fox 17. She won the fight via split decision (28–29, 29–28, and 29–28).

In her second fight for the promotion, Shevchenko faced Amanda Nunes at UFC 196 on March 5, 2016. Although she made an impressive and strong performance in the third round, her slow start in the first two gave the rounds to Nunes. She lost the fight by unanimous decision (29–28, 29–27, and 29–27).

In her third UFC fight, Shevchenko faced former UFC Women's Bantamweight Champion Holly Holm at UFC on Fox: Holm vs. Shevchenko on July 23, 2016. After losing the first round, she rallied back to take over the fight and won a dominant unanimous decision (49–46, 49–46, and 49–46).

Shevchenko faced Julianna Peña in a possible title eliminator match in the main event at UFC on Fox: Shevchenko vs. Peña on January 28, 2017. She won the fight by armbar submission in the second round. The win also earned Shevchenko her first Performance of the Night bonus.

UFC Bantamweight title fight
Shevchenko was expected to rematch the current women's bantamweight champion Amanda Nunes on July 8, 2017, at UFC 213, but on the day of the fight, Nunes fell ill and pulled out of the fight. The doctors cleared Nunes to fight, but she didn't feel up to it, so the fight was called off. Joanna Jędrzejczyk offered to replace Nunes, but the Nevada State Athletic Commission could not clear her on such short notice.

The rematch against Nunes was rescheduled to UFC 215 on September 9, 2017, in Edmonton, Alberta. After a very close back-and-forth fight, Shevchenko lost the fight via split decision (48-47, 48-47, and 47-48). In the post-fight press conference, she voiced her disagreement with the judges' decision but also said she respected the outcome. Out of 22 media outlets, 10 scored it for Nunes, 10 for Shevchenko, and 2 scored it a draw.

Flyweight division
In September 2017, Shevchenko revealed plans to join the 125-pound flyweight division.

Shevchenko faced promotional newcomer Priscila Cachoeira on February 3, 2018, at UFC Fight Night 125. She won the fight in an extremely dominant fashion and via rear-naked choke in round two, outstriking her opponent 230–3. This win earned her the Performance of the Night bonus.

Shevchenko was scheduled to face champion Nicco Montaño on September 8, 2018, at UFC 228. However, prior to the weigh-ins for the event, Montano was transported to a hospital due to the effects of weight cutting. The bout was canceled and Montano was stripped of the Women's Flyweight title. UFC officials then announced that Shevchenko would fight for the vacant 125-pound flyweight title later in 2018.

UFC Women's Flyweight Championship
On September 20, 2018, it was announced that Shevchenko would face Joanna Jędrzejczyk, who was returning to Flyweight, on December 8, 2018, at UFC 231 for the vacant UFC Women's Flyweight Championship. Due to UFC 230 being in need of a main event, Shevchenko was booked against Sijara Eubanks. Eubanks was expected to face Jessica Eye at UFC 232, before being moved to face Shevchenko. After the UFC announced a Heavyweight Championship bout between Daniel Cormier and Derrick Lewis to serve as the main event of UFC 230, UFC confirmed the bout between Shevchenko and Eubanks was canceled and that Shevchenko would return to her original bout at UFC 231 against Jędrzejczyk. Shevchenko defeated Jędrzejczyk by unanimous decision (49-46, 49-46, and 49-46) to become the new UFC Women's Flyweight Champion.

In the first defense of her UFC flyweight title, Shevchenko faced Jessica Eye in the co-main event at UFC 238 on June 8, 2019, She successfully defended her title, winning via a head kick knockout in the second round. This win earned her the Performance of the Night award.

Shevchenko faced Liz Carmouche on August 10, 2019 at UFC on ESPN+ 14. The pairing met previously under a regional promotion banner in 2010 with Carmouche winning the bout in the second round after the doctor stopped the bout due to a large cut stemming from an upkick. Shevchenko won the rematch via unanimous decision (50-45, 50-45, and 50-45).

Shevchenko defended her Flyweight title for the third time against Katlyn Chookagian on February 8, 2020 at UFC 247. She won the fight via TKO in the third round.

Shevchenko was scheduled to face Joanne Calderwood on June 6, 2020 at UFC 250. However, Shevchenko pulled out of the fight citing a leg injury.

In the fourth defense of her title, Shevchenko faced Jennifer Maia on November 21, 2020 at UFC 255. She won the fight via unanimous decision (49-46, 49-46, and 49-46).

In her fifth title defense, Shevchenko faced Jéssica Andrade on April 24, 2021 at UFC 261. After dominating Andrade for most of the bout, Shevchenko won via TKO in round two.

Shevchenko faced Lauren Murphy on September 25, 2021 at UFC 266.  She won the fight via technical knockout in round four, defending her title for the sixth time.

Shevchenko faced Taila Santos on June 12, 2022, at UFC 275. She won the bout via split decision (49-46, 48-47, and 47-48). This fight earned her the Crypto.com "Fan Bonus of the Night" awards paid in bitcoin of US$30,000 for first place.

Shevchenko faced Alexa Grasso on March 4, 2023 at UFC 285. She lost the bout and title via a face crank in the fourth round.

Professional boxing career
Shevchenko made her professional boxing debut on May 8, 2010, at Coliseo Marotta in Callao, Peru against a more experienced Brazilian boxer Halanna dos Santos. She won the fight by unanimous decision. Shevchenko fought from a traditional kickboxing stance and used Muay Thai techniques and grappling tactics multiple times during the match, but wasn't penalized by the referee despite the numerous complaints from her opponent.

The following year, it was announced that Shevchenko will be fighting the boxing champion Melissa Hernandez for her WIBA Lightweight belt. This announcement was met with much criticism from boxing pundits and other boxers alike, as Shevchenko was an unranked fighter with only one professional boxing match on her record at the time of the announcement. After allegedly being threatened to be stripped of her title for refusing to defend it against Shevchenko, Hernandez vacated the belt in November, commenting that Shevchenko fighting for a world title is like "a slap in the face" and that "it's time someone stands up for women's boxing". Lightweight fighter and multiple-time boxing champion Ann Saccurato stepped in to fight Shevchenko for the vacated WIBA title, but the event was eventually canceled.

On December 17, 2011, Shevchenko faced Nerys Rincon at Pueblo Libra Reserclub in Lima, Peru. She won via TKO in the fourth round after sending her opponent to the canvas several times in the third round. Like in her professional debut, she largely fought in a kickboxing stance and frequently used Muay Thai grappling, which Rincon unsuccessfully protested on many occasions during the match.

It was announced that Shevchenko would face a decorated boxer Mary McGee for the vacant WIBA Lightweight championship title on January 14, 2012, in Lima, Peru. However, Shevchenko withdrew from the match for an undisclosed reason later that month and was replaced by Duda Yankovich.

Fighting style
A decorated kickboxer, Shevchenko is primarily known for precise counter-striking. She is recognized for her exceptional ability to gauge the distance of an opponent's attack, then retaliate with a variety of counterattacks. In a 2017 interview, Shevchenko noted the challenges of perfecting this technique in mixed martial arts: "It's different to fight a wrestler and stand-up fighter. To feel the distance of her punch, it's different."

After dodging an opponent's strike, Shevchenko will often counter with a fast right hook, a spinning wheel kick, or a spinning back fist. On offense, she makes regular use of forwarding right hooks and two-punch combinations. She also utilizes an outside leg kick, regularly thrown at the end of a flurry, or in the early stages of a round.

In addition to her striking, Shevchenko is also a highly skilled grappler and has a black belt in Judo, as demonstrated by her multiple take-downs against Holly Holm and Jéssica Andrade, her armbar submission of Julianna Peña, and her rear-naked choke submission over Priscila Cachoeira.

Other ventures
In 2013, Shevchenko was a contestant on the fourth season of the Peruvian dance and competition reality show Combate broadcast by ATV. She placed first in the competition together with her dance partner, South American reality television star Alejandro “Zumba” Benitez. In one of the episodes, she took part in an exhibition wrestling match against Peruvian professional middleweight boxer David Zegarra, which she won by submission in less than a minute.

In 2015, Shevchenko was elected into the IFMA executive board as a representative of the organization's athletic commission. She was also an ambassador for IFMA's "Sport is Your Gang" initiative in Peru, which offered Muay Thai training to marginalized youth as a way to give them an alternative to joining a gang or participating in a violent lifestyle. The project won  the Muaythai Spirit of Sport Award in 2014.

Shevchenko has been regularly competing in the IPSC, IDPA, and 3-Gun pistol shooting competitions since 2010. She began her firearms training in 2006 under the guidance of her coach Pavel Fedotov, a veteran of the Soviet army.

Shevchenko is featured as a playable character in the video games EA Sports UFC 2, EA Sports UFC 3, and EA Sports UFC 4.

Shevchenko appears in the Netflix sports film Bruised starring Halle Berry, in which she plays the role of Lucia "Lady Killer" Chavez, an Argentinian MMA champion and the main rival of Berry's character, Jackie Justice.

Together with Berry, Shevchenko was featured on the digital cover of the December 2021 issue for Women's Health magazine.

Filmography

Film

Championships and accomplishments

Mixed martial arts
Ultimate Fighting Championship
UFC Women's Flyweight Championship (One time, former)
Seven successful title defenses
First woman to defend the UFC Women's Flyweight Championship
Performance of the Night (Three times) vs. Julianna Peña, Priscila Cachoeira, and Jessica Eye
Tied (Katlyn Chookagian) for most wins in UFC Women's Flyweight division history (9) 
Most consecutive wins in UFC Women's Flyweight division (9)
Most consecutive wins in UFC Women's Flyweight division history (9)
Most title defenses by a woman in UFC history (7)
Most consecutive title defenses in the UFC Women's Flyweight division history (7)
Most title wins in UFC Women's Flyweight division history (8)
Most knockout wins in UFC Women's Flyweight division history (4)
Second most finishes in UFC Women's Flyweight division history (5) (behind Gillian Robertson)
Longest average fight time in UFC Women's Flyweight division history (17:01 minutes)
Most takedowns landed in UFC Women's Flyweight division history (35)
Holds victories over four former UFC champions - Holly Holm, Julianna Peña, Joanna Jędrzejczyk, and Jéssica Andrade
MMAJunkie.com
2019 June Knockout of the Month vs. Jessica Eye
CombatPress.com
2020 Female Fighter of the Year
 Cageside Press
 2020 Female Fighter of the Year
BT Sport
2020 Female Fighter of the Year
2021 Female Fighter of the Year
Daily Mirror
2021 Female Fighter of the Year
World MMA Awards
2022 Female Fighter of the Year

Kickboxing
 Kunlun Fight Women's Lightweight Championship (1 title defense)
 2014 Kunlun Fight Female -60kg Tournament Champion
 2013 World K-1 Champion WKC, Peru (60 kg)
 2013 World K-1 Champion WKC, Mexico  (60 kg)
 2005 World Champion KF-1 MMA Pro, Korea, Seoul (57 kg)
 2004 World Kickboxing Champion WAKO, Italy (56 kg)
 2003 World Champion KF-1 MMA Pro, Korea, Seoul  (55 kg)
 2003 World Kickboxing Championship WAKO Bronze Medal, France (56 kg)
 2003 Asia Cup Champion (55 kg)
 2002 Kyrgyzstan National Champion (55 kg)

Judo
 2002 Kyrgyzstan National Champion (58 kg)

Boxing
 2007 Russian Women's National Amateur Champion (57 kg)

Taekwondo
2005 ITF and WTF European Championship, Gold Medal (58 kg)
2005 ITF and WTF European Championship Team Pattern, Gold Medal 
2003 ITF World Championship, Bronze Medal (58 kg)
2002 ITF Asian Championship, Gold Medal (58 kg)

Muay Thai
 2015 I.F.M.A. Royal World Cup Tournament Championship  (60 kg)
 2014 I.F.M.A. World Championship (60 kg)
 2013 World Combat Games, Muay Thai Gold Medalist  (60 kg)
 2012 WMC Muaythai Female Super Lightweight World Champion
 2012 I.F.M.A. World Championship (60 kg)
 2011 I.F.M.A. World Championship, Silver Medal (60 kg)
 2011 WMC-I.F.M.A. South American Championship (63.5 kg)
 2010 I.F.M.A. Panamerican Championship (60 kg)
 2010 World Combat Games, Muay Thai Gold Medalist (60 kg)
 2010 I.F.M.A. World Championship (63.5 kg)
 2009 I.F.M.A. World Championship (60 kg)
 2008 I.F.M.A. World Championship (57 kg)
 2008 R.M.F. Russian National Championship (57 kg)
 2007 I.F.M.A. World Championship (57 kg)
 2007 R.M.F. Russian National Championship (57 kg)
 2006 I.F.M.A. World Championship (57 kg)
 2006 World Muay Thai WMF Champion, Thailand (57 kg)
 2003 I.F.M.A. World Championship  (57 kg)

Mixed martial arts record

|-
| Loss
|align=center|23–4
|Alexa Grasso
|Submission (face crank)
|UFC 285
|
|align=center|4
|align=center|4:34
|Las Vegas, Nevada, United States
|
|-
|Win
|align=center|23–3
|Taila Santos
|Decision (split)
|UFC 275
|
|align=center|5
|align=center|5:00
|Kallang, Singapore
|
|-
|Win
|align=center|22–3
|Lauren Murphy
|TKO (elbows and punches)
|UFC 266 
|
|align=center|4
|align=center|4:00
|Las Vegas, Nevada, United States
|
|-
|Win
|align=center|21–3
|Jéssica Andrade
|TKO (elbows)
|UFC 261
|
|align=center|2
|align=center|3:19
|Jacksonville, Florida, United States
||
|- 
|Win
|align=center|20–3
|Jennifer Maia 
|Decision (unanimous)
|UFC 255
|
|align=center|5
|align=center|5:00
|Las Vegas, Nevada, United States
|
|-
|Win
|align=center|19–3
|Katlyn Chookagian
|TKO (elbows and punches)
|UFC 247 
|
|align=center|3
|align=center|1:03
|Houston, Texas, United States
|
|-
|Win
|align=center|18–3
|Liz Carmouche
|Decision (unanimous)
|UFC Fight Night: Shevchenko vs. Carmouche 2 
|
|align=center|5
|align=center|5:00
|Montevideo, Uruguay
|
|-
|Win
|align=center|17–3
|Jessica Eye
|KO (head kick)	
|UFC 238 
|
|align=center|2
|align=center|0:26
|Chicago, Illinois, United States
|
|-
|Win
|align=center|16–3
|Joanna Jędrzejczyk
|Decision (unanimous)
|UFC 231
|
|align=center|5
|align=center|5:00
|Toronto, Ontario, Canada
|
|-
|Win
|align=center|15–3
|Priscila Cachoeira
|Submission (rear-naked choke)
|UFC Fight Night: Machida vs. Anders
|
|align=center|2
|align=center|4:25
|Belém, Brazil
|
|-
|Loss
|align=center|14–3
|Amanda Nunes
|Decision (split)
|UFC 215
|
|align=center|5
|align=center|5:00
|Edmonton, Alberta, Canada
|
|-
|Win
|align=center|14–2
|Julianna Peña
|Submission (armbar)
|UFC on Fox: Shevchenko vs. Peña
|
|align=center|2
|align=center|4:29
|Denver, Colorado, United States
|
|-
|Win
|align=center|13–2
|Holly Holm
|Decision (unanimous)
|UFC on Fox: Holm vs. Shevchenko
|
|align=center|5
|align=center|5:00
|Chicago, Illinois, United States
|
|-
|Loss
|align=center|12–2
|Amanda Nunes
|Decision (unanimous)
|UFC 196
|
|align=center|3
|align=center|5:00
|Las Vegas, Nevada, United States
|
|-
|Win
|align=center|12-1
|Sarah Kaufman
|Decision (split)
|UFC on Fox: dos Anjos vs. Cowboy 2
|
|align=center|3
|align=center|5:00
|Orlando, Florida, United States
|
|-
|Win
|align=center|11–1
|Jan Finney
|Decision (unanimous)
|Legacy FC 39
|
|align=center|3
|align=center|5:00
|Houston, Texas, United States
|
|-
|Win
|align=center|10–1
|Hellen Bastos
|TKO (doctor stoppage)
|Fusion FC 6
|
|align=center|2
|align=center|3:00
|Lima, Peru
|
|-
|Win
|align=center|9–1
|Priscila Orellana
|TKO (punches)
|Fusion FC 5
|
|align=center|1
|align=center|0:50
|Lima, Peru
|
|-
|Win
|align=center|8–1
|Akjarkyn Baiturbaeva
|Decision (unanimous)
|KF-1: MMA World Competition
|
|align=center|3
|align=center|5:00
|Seoul, South Korea
|
|-
|Loss
|align=center|7–1
|Liz Carmouche
|TKO (retirement)
|C3 Fights: Red River Rivalry
|
|align=center|2
|align=center|3:00
|Concho, Oklahoma, United States
|
|-
|Win
|align=center|7–0
|Yulia Nemtsova
|Submission (ezekiel choke)
|Professional Free Fight
|
|align=center|1
|align=center|1:11
|Krasnodar, Russia
|
|-
|Win
|align=center|6–0
|Kim Kyung-aeh
|Submission (armbar)
|WXF: X-Impact World Championships 2005
|
|align=center|1
|align=center|1:09
|Seoul, South Korea
|
|-
|Win
|align=center|5–0
|Roza Kalieva
|Submission (rear-naked choke)
|Kazakhstan Federation of Pankration 2
|
|align=center|1
|align=center|1:09
|Kokshetau, Kazakhstan
|
|-
|Win
|align=center|4–0	
|Alla Iskarenova
|Submission (rear-naked choke)
|Kazakhstan Federation of Pankration
|
|align=center|1
|align=center|1:12
|Kokshetau, Kazakhstan
|
|-
|Win
|align=center|3–0
|Erkesh Kokoeva
|TKO (punches)
|Kyrgyz Federation of Kulatuu 2
|
|align=center|1
|align=center|N/A
|Kyrgyzstan
|
|-
|Win
|align=center|2–0
|Kim Mi-choi
|Submission (rear-naked choke)
|WXF: X-Impact World Championships 2003
|
|align=center|1
|align=center|1:55
|Seoul, South Korea
|
|-
|Win
|align=center|1–0
|Eliza Aidaralieva
|TKO (punches)
|Kyrgyz Federation of Kulatuu
|
|align=center|2
|align=center|N/A
|Kyrgyzstan
|
|-

Professional boxing record

|- align=center
| 2
|
|2–0
|align=left|
| 
|4
|2:38
|
|align=left| Coliseo ReserClub de Pueblo Libre, Lima, Peru
| 
|- align=center
| 1
|
|1–0
|align=left|
| 
|10
|2:00
|
|align=left|Coliseo Marotta, Callao, Peru
| 
|}

Professional Kickboxing and Muay Thai record 

|-  style="background:#fbb;"
| 2015-10-31 || Loss ||align=left| Cong Wang || Kunlun Fight 33 || Changde, China || Decision (Unanimous) || 3 || 3:00
|-
! style=background:white colspan=9 |Loses the Kunlun Fight Women's Lightweight Championship -60 kg.
|-  style="background:#cfc;"
| 2015-07-24 || Win ||align=left| Anke Van Gestel || Legacy Kickboxing 3 || Houston, Texas, United States || Decision (Unanimous) || 5 || 3:00
|-  style="background:#cfc;"
| 2015-01-16 || Win ||align=left| Lindsay Haycraft || Legacy Kickboxing 1 || Houston, Texas, United States || Decision (Unanimous) || 5 || 3:00
|-  style="background:#cfc;"
| 2014-10-05 || Win ||align=left| Chali Bassinah || Kunlun Fight 11 || Macau, China || Decision (Unanimous) || 3 || 3:00
|- 
! style=background:white colspan=9 |Retains the Kunlun Fight Women's Lightweight Championship -60 kg.
|-  style="background:#cfc;"
| 2014-08-31 || Win ||align=left| Irina Mazepa || Kunlun Fight 9 - 2014 Legend of Mulan Tournament, Final || Shangqiu, China || KO (High kick) || 1 || 2:59
|-
! style=background:white colspan=9 |Wins the Kunlun Fight Women's Lightweight Championship and the Kunlun Fight 2014 Female -60kg Tournament.
|-  style="background:#cfc;"
| 2014-08-31 || Win ||align=left| Yang Yang || Kunlun Fight 9 - 2014 Legend of Mulan Tournament, Semi-finals || Shangqiu, China || Decision (Unanimous) || 3 || 3:00
|-  style="background:#cfc;"
| 2014-08-31 || Win ||align=left| Elisa Qualizza || Kunlun Fight 9 - 2014 Legend of Mulan Tournament, Quarter Finals || Shangqiu, China || Decision (Unanimous) || 3 || 3:00
|-  style="background:#cfc;"
| 2013-12-1 || Win ||align=left| Maria Ruso || WKL Championship || Cordoba, Argentina || Decision (Unanimous) || 5 || 2:00
|-  style="background:#cfc;"
| 2013-06-22 || Win ||align=left| Fabiana Dutra|| South American Muay Thai Championship || Asunción, Paraguay || TKO (Spinning back kick to the body) || 1 || 1:31
|-  style="background:#cfc;"
| 2013-03-02 || Win ||align=left| Malena Muñoz|| WKC K-1 World Championships 2013 || Lima, Peru || TKO (Spinning back kick to the body) || 1 || 2:30
|- 
! style=background:white colspan=9 |Retains the WKC K-1 Lightweight World Championship -60 kg
|-  style="background:#cfc;"
| 2013-01-06 || Win ||align=left| Tania Gonzales|| WKC K-1 World Championships 2013 || Mexico || Decision (Unanimous) || 3 || 3:00
|- 
! style=background:white colspan=9 |Wins the WKC K-1 Lightweight World Championship -60 kg
|-  style="background:#cfc;"
| 2012-12-02 || Win ||align=left| Patricia Silva|| Super Luta Feminina || Porto Alegre, Brazil || Decision (Unanimous) || 4 || 3:00
|-  style="background:#cfc;"
| 2012-08-24 || Win ||align=left| Laura Soledad Griffa|| Titulo Mondial de Kickboxing || Lima, Peru || Decision (Unanimous) || 4 || 3:00
|-  style="background:#cfc;"
| 2012-04-28 || Win ||align=left| Stephanie Ielö Page || Double championnat du monde WMC || Brest, France || Decision (Unanimous) || 5 || 3:00
|- 
! style=background:white colspan=9 |Wins the WMC Muaythai Female Super Lightweight World Champion.
|-  style="background:#cfc;"
| 2011-11-06 || Win ||align=left| Ilona Wijmans || Muaythai Premier League: Third Round Netherlands || The Hague, Netherlands || Decision (Unanimous) || 5 || 3:00
|-  style="background:#cfc;"
| 2011-09-02 || Win ||align=left| Angélique Pitiot || Muaythai Premier League: First Round California || Long Beach, California, USA || Decision (Split) || 5 || 3:00
|-  style="background:#cfc;"
| 2011-05-16 || Win ||align=left| Ruth Stephanie Aquino || South American Muay Thai Championship || Buenos Aires, Argentina || Decision (Unanimous) || 3 || 2:00
|-
! style=background:white colspan=9 |Wins the WMC-I.F.M.A. South American Muay Thai Championship -63.5 kg.
|-  style="background:#cfc;"
| 2011-02-09 || Win ||align=left| Martina Jindrová || Bangla Boxing Stadium || Phuket, Thailand || Decision (Unanimous) || 5 || 2:00
|-  style="background:#cfc;"
| 2010-12-14 || Win ||align=left| Carla Nadu || Andaman Coast Muay Thai Championship || Phuket, Thailand || Decision || 5 || 2:00
|-  style="background:#cfc;"
| 2010-10-04 || Win ||align=left| Tainara Lisboa || INKA Fight Championship || Lima, Peru || Decision (Unanimous) || 4 || 2:00
|-  style="background:#cfc;"
| 2010-02-9 || Win ||align=left| Ning Le || K-1 event in China || China || TKO (Knee and punches)  || 1 || 1:19
|-  style="background:#cfc;"
| 2010-01-29 || Win ||align=left| Nombum Honchenjin || N/A || Phuket, Thailand || TKO (Corner stoppage) || 4 || 2:00
|-  style="background:#cfc;"
| 2010-01-14|| Win ||align=left| Madeleine Vall || Andaman Coast Muay Thai Championship || Phuket, Thailand || Decision || 4 || 2:00
|-  style="background:#cfc;"
| 2010-01-13 || Win ||align=left| Geraldine O'Callaghan || N/A || Thailand || Decision || 4 || N/A
|-  style="background:#fbb;"
| 2010-01-3 || Loss ||align=left| Bai Ling || Wu Lin Feng: China vs. Africa  || Zhangzhou, China  || Technical Decision (Unanimous) || 4 || N/A
|-  style="background:#cfc;"
| 2009-10-02 || Win ||align=left| Mahalia Rocha de Morais || Martial Arts Festival XVIII || Lima, Peru || TKO (Punches) || N/A || N/A
|-  style="background:#cfc;"
| 2008-05-03 || Win ||align=left| Chajmaa Bellekhal || Next Generation Warriors || Utrecht, Netherlands || Decision || 5 || 3:00
|-  style="background:#fbb;"
| 2008-04-19 || Loss ||align=left| Debby Urkens || Temple of Thaiboxing || Bladel, Netherlands || Decision || 5 || 3:00
|-  style="background:#cfc;"
| 2008-01-29|| Win ||align=left| Sumwan Thorat || Andaman Coast Muay Thai Championship || Ko Samui, Thailand || KO (Elbow) || 4 || 1:56
|-  style="background:#cfc;"
| 2005-10-?|| Win ||align=left| Yulia Yelskaya || Russian Muay Thai Championship || Nizhny Novgorod, Russia || Decision || 4 || N/A
|-  style="background:#cfc;"
| 2005-04-?|| Win ||align=left| Irina Yakhno || N/A || Krasnodar, Russia || TKO (Corner stoppage) || 4 || 2:00
|-  style="background:#cfc;"
| 2005-?-?|| Win ||align=left| Maria Ostapchuk || N/A || Krasnodar, Russia || TKO || 5 || N/A
|-  style="background:#cfc;"
| 2005-?-?|| Win ||align=left| Ingrid Graziani ||Russia vs. France  || Krasnodar, Russia || KO (Punch) || 1 || 1:24
|-  style="background:#cfc;"
| 2004-08-?|| Win ||align=left| Ekaterina Azadova || Asian Open Junior Kickboxing Championship || Bishkek, Kyrgyzstan || Decision (Unanimous) || 3 || N/A
|-  style="background:#cfc;"
| 2004-03-10|| Win ||align=left| Oksana Chernikova || BARS: Female Fights || Moscow, Russia || N/A || N/A || N/A
|- style="background:#cfc;"
| 2004-?-?|| Win ||align=left| Svetlana Kulakova || N/A || Bishkek, Kyrgyzstan || Decision || 3 || 2:00
|- style="background:#cfc;"
| 2003-?-?|| Win ||align=left| Gulzara Azizova || Asian Cup Kickboxing Final || Bishkek, Kyrgyzstan || Decision || 6 || 2:00
|-
! style=background:white colspan=9 |Wins the Asia Cup -55 kg.
|- style="background:#cfc;
| 2003-02-?|| Win ||align=left| Tina Zakarian || Kickboxing: Kyrgyzstan vs. Lebanon || Muscat, Oman || Decision || 3 || 2:00
|-

|-  style="background:#cfc;"
| 2015-08-23|| Win ||align=left| Mariya Valent || I.F.M.A. Royal World cup Tournament 2015, Finals -60 kg || Bangkok, Thailand || Decision || 3 || 3:00
|- 
! style=background:white colspan=9 | 
|-  style="background:#cfc;"
| 2015-08-20|| Win ||align=left| Anke Van Gestel || I.F.M.A. Royal World cup Tournament 2015, Semi-finals -60 kg || Bangkok, Thailand || KO (Slam) || 1 || 2:58
|-  style="background:#cfc;"
| 2015-08-16|| Win ||align=left| Nili Block || I.F.M.A. Royal World cup Tournament 2015, Quarter Finals -60 kg || Bangkok, Thailand || Decision || 3 || 3:00
|-  style="background:#cfc;"
| 2015-08-14|| Win ||align=left| Kaoutar Houkman || I.F.M.A. Royal World cup Tournament 2015, Eighth Finals -60 kg || Bangkok, Thailand || Decision || 3 || 3:00
|-  style="background:#cfc;"
| 2014-05-10|| Win ||align=left| Mariya Valent || I.F.M.A. World Championship Tournament 2014, Finals -60 kg || Langkawi, Malaysia || Decision || 3 || 3:00
|- 
! style=background:white colspan=9 |
|-  style="background:#cfc;"
| 2014-05-06|| Win ||align=left| Janice MacAulay || I.F.M.A. World Championship Tournament 2014, Semi-finals -60 kg || Langkawi, Malaysia || Decision || 3 || 3:00
|-  style="background:#cfc;"
| 2014-05-05|| Win ||align=left| Gia Winberg || I.F.M.A. World Championship Tournament 2014, Quarter Finals -60 kg || Langkawi, Malaysia || Decision || 3 || 3:00
|-  style="background:#cfc;"
| 2014-05-01|| Win ||align=left| Siobhan Foley || I.F.M.A. World Championship Tournament 2014, Eighth Finals -60 kg || Langkawi, Malaysia || N/A || N/A || N/A
|-  style="background:#cfc;"
| 2013-10-23 || Win ||align=left| Anastasia Sharmonova || 2013 World Combat Games -60 kg/132 lb Muay Thai, Final || St. Petersburg, Russia || Decision || 3 || 3:00
|- 
! style=background:white colspan=9 |
|-  style="background:#cfc;"
| 2013-10-21 || Win ||align=left| Pimnipa Tanawatpipat || 2013 World Combat Games -60 kg/132 lb Muay Thai, Semi-final || St. Petersburg, Russia || Decision || 3 || 3:00
|-  style="background:#cfc;"
| 2013-10-19 || Win ||align=left| Zuunast Altansukh || 2013 World Combat Games -60 kg/132 lb Muay Thai, Quarter Final || St. Petersburg, Russia || TKO (Body kick) || 3 || N/A
|-  style="background:#cfc;"
| 2012-09-12|| Win ||align=left| Katsiaryna Viaryha || I.F.M.A. World Championship Tournament 2012, Finals -60 kg || St. Petersburg, Russia || Decision || 4 || 2:00
|- 
! style=background:white colspan=9 |
|-  style="background:#cfc;"
| 2012-09-11|| Win ||align=left| Magdalena Edyta || I.F.M.A. World Championship Tournament 2012, Semi-finals -60 kg || St. Petersburg, Russia || Decision || 4 || 2:00
|-  style="background:#cfc;"
| 2012-09-10|| Win ||align=left| Lambert Laetitia || I.F.M.A. World Championship Tournament 2012, Quarter Finals -60 kg || St. Petersburg, Russia || Decision || 4 || 2:00
|-  style="background:#cfc;"
| 2012-09-07|| Win ||align=left| Alfia Ishirgakova || I.F.M.A. World Championship Tournament 2012, First Round -60 kg || St. Petersburg, Russia || Decision || 4 || 2:00
|-  style="background:#fbb;"
| 2011-09-26|| Loss ||align=left| Aicha El Majydy || I.F.M.A. World Championship Tournament 2011, Finals -60 kg || Tashkent, Uzbekistan || Decision || N/A || N/A
|- 
! style=background:white colspan=9 |
|-  style="background:#cfc;"
| 2011-09-23|| Win ||align=left| Alfia Ishirgakova || I.F.M.A. World Championship Tournament 2011, Semi-finals -60 kg || Tashkent, Uzbekistan || TKO (Punches) || 4 || 1:07
|-  style="background:#cfc;"
| 2011-09-21|| Win ||align=left| Anke Van Gestel || I.F.M.A. World Championship Tournament 2011, Quarter Finals -60 kg || Tashkent, Uzbekistan || Decision|| N/A || N/A
|-  style="background:#cfc;"
| 2010-12-06|| Win ||align=left| Lina Länsberg || I.F.M.A. World Championship Tournament 2010, Finals -63.5 kg || Bangkok, Thailand || Decision || 4 || 2:00
|- 
! style=background:white colspan=9 |
|-  style="background:#cfc;"
| 2010-12-05|| Win ||align=left| Anna Willberg || I.F.M.A. World Championship Tournament 2010, Semi-finals -63.5 kg || Bangkok, Thailand || Decision || 4 || 2:00
|-  style="background:#cfc;"
| 2010-12-03|| Win ||align=left| Marja Belush || I.F.M.A. World Championship Tournament 2010, Quarter Finals -63.5 kg || Bangkok, Thailand || TKO (Spinning back kick to the body) || 3 || 1:46
|-  style="background:#cfc;"
| 2010-11-29|| Win ||align=left| Valentina Gupalo || I.F.M.A. World Championship Tournament 2010, Eight Finals -63.5 kg || Bangkok, Thailand || Decision || 4 || 2:00
|-  style="background:#cfc;"
| 2010-09-02 || Win ||align=left| Caley Reece || 2010 World Combat Games -60 kg/132 lb Muay Thai, Final || Beijing, China || Decision (Unanimous) || 4 || 2:00
|- 
! style=background:white colspan=9 |
|-  style="background:#cfc;"
| 2010-08-31 || Win ||align=left| Ania Fucz || 2010 World Combat Games -60 kg/132 lb Muay Thai, Semi-finals || Beijing, China || KO (Slam) || 2 || 1:47
|-  style="background:#cfc;"
| 2010-08-29 || Win ||align=left| Madeleine Ross || 2010 World Combat Games -60 kg/132 lb Muay Thai, Quarter Finals || Beijing, China || Decision (Unanimous) || 4 || 2:00
|-  style="background:#cfc;"
| 2010-04-07|| Win ||align=left| Adriana Rocha || I.F.M.A. Panamerican Championship Tournament 2009, Finals -60 kg || Vitoria, Brazil || Decision || 3 || 3:00
|- 
! style=background:white colspan=9 |
|-  style="background:#cfc;"
| 2009-12-04|| Win ||align=left| Alena Muratova || I.F.M.A. World Championship Tournament 2009, Finals -60 kg || Bangkok, Thailand || Decision || 3 || 3:00
|- 
! style=background:white colspan=9 |
|-  style="background:#cfc;"
| 2009-12-?|| Win ||align=left| Carly Reece || I.F.M.A. World Championship Tournament 2009, Semi-finals -60 kg || Bangkok, Thailand || Decision || 3 || 3:00
|-  style="background:#cfc;"
| 2009-12-?|| Win ||align=left| Emma Thyni || I.F.M.A. World Championship Tournament 2009, Quarter Finals -60 kg || Bangkok, Thailand || Decision || 3 || 3:00
|-  style="background:#cfc;"
| 2008-09-?|| Win ||align=left| Joanna Jędrzejczyk || I.F.M.A. World Championship Tournament 2008, Finals -57 kg || Busan, South Korea || Decision || 3 || 3:00
|- 
! style=background:white colspan=9 |
|-  style="background:#cfc;"
| 2008-09-?|| Win ||align=left| Gozde Bayergi || I.F.M.A. World Championship Tournament 2008, Semi-finals -57 kg || Busan, South Korea || Decision || 3 || 3:00
|-  style="background:#cfc;"
| 2008-09-?|| Win ||align=left| Alla Ivashkevich || I.F.M.A. World Championship Tournament 2008, Quarter Finals -57 kg || Busan, South Korea || Decision || 3 || 3:00
|-  style="background:#cfc;"
| 2008-09-?|| Win ||align=left| Mikaela Mélante || I.F.M.A. World Championship Tournament 2008, First Round -57 kg || Busan, South Korea || Decision || 3 || 3:00
|-  style="background:#cfc;"
| 2007-12-?|| Win ||align=left| Vipavat Lasuwan || I.F.M.A. World Championship Tournament 2007, Finals -57 kg || Bangkok, Thailand || Decision || 4 || 2:00
|- 
! style=background:white colspan=9 |
|-  style="background:#cfc;"
| 2007-12-?|| Win ||align=left| Liisi Airo || I.F.M.A. World Championship Tournament 2007, Semi-finals -57 kg || Bangkok, Thailand || Decision || 4 || 2:00
|-  style="background:#cfc;"
| 2007-11-29|| Win ||align=left| Joanna Jędrzejczyk || I.F.M.A. World Championship Tournament 2007, Quarter Finals -57 kg || Bangkok, Thailand || Decision || 4 || 2:00
|-  style="background:#cfc;"
| 2006-06-07|| Win ||align=left| Misty Sutherland || I.F.M.A. World Championship Tournament 2006, Finals -57 kg || Bangkok, Thailand || Decision || 3 || 3:00
|- 
! style=background:white colspan=9 |
|-  style="background:#cfc;"
| 2006-06-?|| Win ||align=left| Heather O’Donnell || I.F.M.A. World Championship Tournament 2006, Semi-finals -57 kg || Bangkok, Thailand || Decision || 3 || 3:00
|-  style="background:#cfc;"
| 2006-05-31|| Win ||align=left| Joanna Jędrzejczyk || I.F.M.A. World Championship Tournament 2006, Quarter Finals -57 kg || Bangkok, Thailand || Decision || 3 || 3:00
|-  style="background:#cfc;"
| 2006-03-26|| Win ||align=left| Nicola Simson || WMF World Championship Tournament 2006, Finals -57 kg || Bangkok, Thailand || N/A || N/A || N/A
|- 
! style=background:white colspan=9 |
|-  style="background:#cfc;"
| 2006-03-?|| Win ||align=left| Maria Pymakova || WMF World Championship Tournament 2006, Semi-finals -57 kg || Bangkok, Thailand || N/A || N/A || N/A
|-  style="background:#cfc;"
| 2006-03-24|| Win ||align=left| Ursula Trump || WMF World Championship Tournament 2006, Quarter Finals -57 kg || Bangkok, Thailand || N/A || N/A || N/A
|-  style="background:#cfc;"
| 2004-?-?|| Win ||align=left| Oksana Kinak || WAKO World Championship Tournament 2004, Finals -56 kg || Massa, Italy || Decision || 3 || 2:00 
|-
! style=background:white colspan=9 |
|- style="background:#cfc;"
| 2004-?-?|| Win ||align=left| Ivana Didovich  || WAKO World Championship Tournament 2004, Semi-finals -56 kg || Massa, Italy || Decision || 3 || 2:00
|- style="background:#cfc;"
| 2004-?-?|| Win ||align=left| Kristina Tomasz  || WAKO World Championship Tournament 2004, Quarter Finals -56 kg || Massa, Italy || N/A || N/A || N/A
|- style="background:#cfc;"
| 2003-09-?|| Win ||align=left| Yulia Semenova  || I.F.M.A. World Championship Tournament 2003, Finals -57 kg|| Almaty, Kazakhstan || N/A || N/A || N/A
|-
! style=background:white colspan=9 |
|- style="background:#cfc;"
| 2003-09-?|| Win ||align=left| Vikki Brangar || I.F.M.A. World Championship Tournament 2003, Semi-finals -57 kg || Almaty, Kazakhstan || N/A || N/A || N/A
|- style="background:#cfc;"
| 2003-09-?|| Win ||align=left| N/A || I.F.M.A. World Championship Tournament 2003, Quarter Finals -57 kg || Almaty, Kazakhstan || N/A || N/A || N/A
|- style="background:#cfc;"
| 2003-09-?|| Win ||align=left| N/A || I.F.M.A. World Championship Tournament 2003, First Round -57 kg || Almaty, Kazakhstan || N/A || N/A || N/A
|-
| colspan=9 | Legend:

See also
 List of current UFC fighters
 List of female mixed martial artists

References

External links

 

Living people
1988 births
Sportspeople from Bishkek
Female Muay Thai practitioners
Bantamweight mixed martial artists
Mixed martial artists utilizing taekwondo
Mixed martial artists utilizing boxing
Mixed martial artists utilizing Muay Thai
Mixed martial artists utilizing judo
Mixed martial artists utilizing kickboxing
Lightweight kickboxers
Kyrgyzstani female kickboxers
Kyrgyzstani women boxers
Kyrgyzstani female judoka
Kyrgyzstani female mixed martial artists
Kyrgyzstani Muay Thai practitioners
Kyrgyzstani female taekwondo practitioners
Kyrgyzstani people of Ukrainian descent
Kyrgyzstani emigrants to Peru
Naturalized citizens of Peru
Peruvian female mixed martial artists
Peruvian female kickboxers
Peruvian women boxers
Peruvian female judoka
Peruvian Muay Thai practitioners
Peruvian female taekwondo practitioners
Peruvian people of Ukrainian descent
Kyrgyzstani expatriates in the United States
Peruvian expatriates in the United States
Kyrgyzstani film actresses
Peruvian film actresses
Flyweight mixed martial artists
Kunlun Fight kickboxers
Ultimate Fighting Championship champions
Ultimate Fighting Championship female fighters
Peruvian people of Russian descent
Kyrgyzstani people of Russian descent